Mazesoba may refer to:
 Aburasoba, Japanese noodle dish category
 Taiwan mazesoba, a noodle dish from Nagoya, Japan